Andres Jalak (born 1953) is an Estonian politician. He was a member of X Riigikogu.

He has been a member of Res Publica Party.

References

Living people
1953 births
Members of the Riigikogu, 2003–2007
Place of birth missing (living people)
Members of the Riigikogu, 2011–2015
Date of birth missing (living people)